GKM College of Engineering and Technology is an  ISO certified institution established in 1996. It is located in New Perungalathur, on the suburbs of Chennai, Tamil Nadu, India. The courses offered here are approved by the All India Council for Technical Education (AICTE), Government of India. The Courses offered are accredited by National Board of Accreditation (NBA), New Delhi, India.

Courses offered include:

Undergraduate
B.E. Biomedical Engineering
B.E. Civil Engineering
B.E. Mechanical Engineering
B.E. Marine Engineering
B.E. Electrical and Electronics Engineering
B.E. Electronics and Communication Engineering
B.E. Computer Science and Engineering

Post-graduate
M.E.-  Biomedical Engineering
M.E. - Computer Science and Engineering
M.E. - Computer Aided Design
M.E. - Communication Systems
M.E. - Embedded System Technologies
M.E. - Computer Integrated Manufacturing
M.E. - Construction Engineering and Management
M.E. - Computer Networks
M.E. - Digital Signal Processing
M.E. - Engineering Design
M.Tech - Nanotechnology
M.E. - Power Systems Engineering
M.E. - Software Engineering
M.Sc. - Information Technology
M.B.A. - Master of Business Administration
M.C.A. - Master of Computer Application

External links
 Official site

Engineering colleges in Chennai
Colleges affiliated to Anna University
Educational institutions established in 1996
1996 establishments in Tamil Nadu